In functional analysis and related areas of mathematics a polar topology, topology of -convergence or topology of uniform convergence on the sets of  is a method to define locally convex topologies on the vector spaces of a pairing.

Preliminaries 

A pairing is a triple  consisting of two vector spaces over a field  (either the real numbers or complex numbers) and a bilinear map 
A dual pair or dual system is a pairing  satisfying the following two separation axioms:
  separates/distinguishes points of : for all non-zero  there exists  such that  and
  separates/distinguishes points of : for all non-zero  there exists  such that

Polars 

The polar or absolute polar of a subset  is the set

The polar is a convex balanced set containing the origin.

Weak topologies 

Suppose that  is a pairing of vector spaces over 

Weak boundedness and absorbing polars 

It is because of the following theorem that it is almost always assumed that the family  consists of -bounded subsets of

Dual definitions and results 

Every pairing  can be associated with a corresponding pairing  where by definition 

There is a repeating theme in duality theory, which is that any definition for a pairing  has a corresponding dual definition for the pairing 

For instance, after defining " distinguishes points of " (resp, " is a total subset of ") as above, then the dual definition of " distinguishes points of " (resp, " is a total subset of ") is immediately obtained. 
For instance, once  is defined then it should be automatically assume that  has been defined without mentioning the analogous definition. 
The same applies to many theorems.

Convention: Adhering to common practice, unless clarity is needed, whenever a definition (or result) is given for a pairing  then mention the corresponding dual definition (or result) will be omitted but it may nevertheless be used.

Although it is technically incorrect and an abuse of notation, the following convention is nearly ubiquitous:

Polar topologies 

forms a neighbourhood subbasis at the origin. When  is endowed with this -topology then it is denoted by  

If  is a sequence of positive numbers converging to  then the defining neighborhood subbasis at  may be replaced with

without changing the resulting topology.

When  is a directed set with respect to subset inclusion (i.e. if for all  there exists some  such that ) then the defining neighborhood subbasis at the origin actually forms a neighborhood basis at 

Seminorms defining the polar topology

Every  determines a seminorm  defined by

Modifying 

without changing the resulting topology.

The following theorem gives ways in which  can be modified without changing the resulting -topology on 

It is because of this theorem that many authors often require that  also satisfy the following additional conditions:
The union of any two sets  is contained in some set ;
All scalar multiples of every  belongs to 

Some authors further assume that every  belongs to some set  because this assumption suffices to ensure that the -topology is Hausdorff.

Convergence of nets and filters

If  then  in the -topology on  if and only if for all  

Properties 

The results in the article Topologies on spaces of linear maps can be applied to polar topologies.

Hausdorffness

We say that  covers  if every point in  belong to some set in 

 
Proof of (2): 
If  then we're done, so assume otherwise.

Since  distinguishes points of  there exists some (non-zero)  such that  where (since  is surjective) it can be assumed without loss of generality that  The set  is a -open subset of  that is not empty (since it contains ).

Examples of polar topologies induced by a pairing 

Throughout,  will be a pairing of vector spaces over the field  and  will be a non-empty collection of -bounded subsets of 

The following table will omit mention of  The topologies are listed in an order that roughly corresponds with coarser topologies first and the finer topologies last; note that some of these topologies may be out of order e.g.  and the topology below it (i.e. the topology generated by -complete and bounded disks) or if  is not Hausdorff. If more than one collection of subsets appears the same row in the left-most column then that means that the same polar topology is generated by these collections.

Weak topology σ(Y, X) 

 

for some real  and some finite set of points  in 

In general, the convex balanced hull of a -compact subset of  need not be -compact.

  for all

Mackey topology τ(Y, X) 

Since in general, the convex balanced hull of a -compact subset of  need not be -compact, the Mackey topology may be strictly coarser than the topology  Since every -compact set is -bounded, the Mackey topology is coarser than the strong topology

Strong topology 𝛽(Y, X) 

A neighborhood basis (not just a subbasis) at the origin for the  topology is:

The strong topology  is finer than the Mackey topology.

Polar topologies and topological vector spaces 

Properties 

If  covers  then the canonical map from  into  is well-defined. That is, for all  the evaluation functional on  meaning the map  is continuous on  
 If in addition  separates points on  then the canonical map of  into  is an injection.

Polar topologies on the continuous dual space 

The table below defines many of the most common polar topologies on 

The reason why some of the above collections (in the same row) induce the same polar topologies is due to some basic results. A closed subset of a complete TVS is complete and that a complete subset of a Hausdorff and complete TVS is closed. Furthermore, in every TVS, compact subsets are complete and the balanced hull of a compact (resp. totally bounded) subset is again compact (resp. totally bounded). Also, a Banach space can be complete without being weakly complete.

Weak/weak* topology  

The  topology has the following properties:
Then  is continuous.
 In particular, any separately continuous bilinear maps from the product of two duals of reflexive Fréchet spaces into a third one is continuous.
 is normable if and only if  is finite-dimensional.
Suppose that  is a locally convex Hausdorff space and that  is its completion. If  then  is strictly finer than 
Any equicontinuous subset in the dual of a separable Hausdorff locally convex vector space is metrizable in the  topology.
If  is locally convex then a subset  is -bounded if and only if there exists a barrel  in  such that

Compact-convex convergence  

If  is a Fréchet space then the topologies

Compact convergence  

If  is a Fréchet space or a LF-space then  is complete.

Precompact convergence 

Banach–Alaoglu theorem: An equicontinuous subset  has compact closure in the topology of uniform convergence on precompact sets. Furthermore, this topology on  coincides with the  topology.

Mackey topology  

Strong dual topology  

The topology has the following properties:
If  is locally convex, then this topology is finer than all other -topologies on  when considering only 's whose sets are subsets of 
If  is a bornological space (e.g. metrizable or LF-space) then is complete.
If  is a normed space then the strong dual topology on  may be defined by the norm  where 
If  is a LF-space that is the inductive limit of the sequence of space  (for ) then  is a Fréchet space if and only if all  are normable.
If  is a Montel space then

Mackey topology  

Polar topologies induced by subsets of the continuous dual space 

Weak topology  

Then  is continuous if and only if  is continuous. That is,  is continuous when  and  carry their given topologies if and only if  is continuous when  and  carry their weak topologies.

Convergence on equicontinuous sets  

If  was the set of all convex balanced weakly compact equicontinuous subsets of  then the same topology would have been induced.

If  is locally convex and Hausdorff then 's given topology (i.e. the topology that  started with) is exactly  
That is, for  Hausdorff and locally convex, if  then  is equicontinuous if and only if  is equicontinuous and furthermore, for any   is a neighborhood of the origin if and only if  is equicontinuous.

Since a TVS's topology is completely determined by the open neighborhoods of the origin, this means that via operation of taking the polar of a set, the collection of equicontinuous subsets of  "encode" all information about 's topology (i.e. distinct TVS topologies on  produce distinct collections of equicontinuous subsets, and given any such collection one may recover the TVS original topology by taking the polars of sets in the collection). Thus uniform convergence on the collection of equicontinuous subsets is essentially "convergence on the topology of ".

Mackey topology  

Suppose that  is a locally convex Hausdorff space. If  is metrizable or barrelled then 's original topology is identical to the Mackey topology

Topologies compatible with pairings 

The answer to this question is called the Mackey–Arens theorem.

See also

References 

  
 
  
  

Topology of function spaces
Linear functionals